Vyommitra (Sanskrit; IAST:Vyom Mitrā) is a female-looking spacefaring humanoid robot being developed by the Indian Space Research Organisation to function on-board the Gaganyaan, a crewed orbital spacecraft. Vyommitra was first unveiled on 22 January 2020 at the Human Spaceflight and Exploration symposium in Bengaluru.

It will accompany Indian astronauts in space missions and will also be a part of uncrewed experimental Gaganyaan missions prior to the crewed spaceflight missions.

Objectives and abilities 
ISRO aims not to fly animals onboard experimental missions unlike other nations that have carried out human space flight. Instead, it will fly humanoid robots for a better understanding of what weightlessness and radiation do to the human body during long durations in space.

Vyommitra is expected to be onboard uncrewed Gaganyaan missions to perform microgravity experiments, monitor module parameters, and support astronauts in crewed missions by simulating functions exact like human. It is programmed to speak Hindi and English and perform multiple tasks. It can mimic human activity, recognize other humans, and respond to their queries. Technically, it can perform environment control and life support systems functions, handle switch panel operations, and give environmental air pressure change warnings.

See also 
 Indian Human Spaceflight Programme
 Gaganyaan
 Fedor
 Kirobo
 Robonaut

References 

Indian Space Research Organisation
Humanoid space robots